Nizhneye Chazhestrovo is a rural locality (a village) in Vinogradovsky District, Arkhangelsk Oblast, Russia. The population was 197 as of 2010. There are 6 streets.

Geography 
Nizhneye Chazhestrovo is located on the Severnaya Dvina River, 7 km northwest of Bereznik (the district's administrative centre) by road. Verkhneye Chazhestrovo is the nearest rural locality.

References 

Rural localities in Vinogradovsky District